Euglesa waldeni is a species of mollusc belonging to the family Sphaeriidae.

It is native to Northern Europe.

Synonym:
 Pisidium waldeni Kuiper, 1975 (= basionym)

References

Sphaeriidae
Molluscs  described in 1975